RID may refer to:

 Isaiah ben Mali di Trani (the Elder), an Italian Talmudist
 Radial immunodiffusion, a scientific technique for measuring the quantity of an antigen
 Radionuclide identification device, a hand-held instrument for the detection and identification of radioactive sources
 Refractive index detector, a type of chromatography detector
 Registry of Interpreters for the Deaf, an American Sign Language interpreters' organization
 Relative identifier, a component of Microsoft Windows NT security
 RID (insect repellent), an Australian brand
 Rivista Italiana Difesa, an Italian magazine related to military and geo-strategic issues
 Robots in Disguise, an English electro band
 Royal Institute Dictionary, a prescriptive dictionary of Thailand
 Real-time Inter-network Defense, a reporting method for sharing incident-handling data between networks